Ubuntu JeOS (pronounced "juice") is a discontinued variant of Ubuntu that is described as "an efficient variant ... configured specifically for virtual appliances." It is a concept for what an operating system should look like in the context of a virtual appliance. JeOS stands for "Just enough Operating System." JeOS has been replaced by Ubuntu Core, which is now an officially supported minimal variant of Ubuntu.

Its first release was Ubuntu JeOS 7.10, and since the release of Ubuntu 8.10 it has been included as an option as part of the standard Ubuntu Server Edition.

Supported platforms 
The latest version of JeOS is optimized for virtualization technologies by VMware, Inc. and the Linux Kernel-based Virtual Machine.

Specifications 

Specifications for version 8.10 and above include:
 Part of the standard Ubuntu Server ISO image
 Less than 380 MB installed footprint
 Specialized server kernel
 Intended for VMware ESX, VMware Server, libvirt and KVM
 128 MB minimum memory
 No graphical environment preloaded

See also 

 SUSE Linux Enterprise JeOS
 OpenSolaris JeOS
 List of Ubuntu-based distributions
 Ubuntu Certified Professional

References

External links 
 JeOS and vmbuilder in Ubuntu Server Guide for Ubuntu 12.04 LTS
 Ubuntu Server features: Virtualisation
 Ubuntu JeOS at Launchpad
  at Linux-Mag.com
 Community Ubuntu Documentation

Ubuntu derivatives
Just enough operating systems
Linux distributions